Dawud ibn Yazid ibn Hatim al-Muhallabi (died 820 or 821) was a provincial governor for the Abbasid dynasty in the late eighth and early ninth centuries. A member of the prominent Muhallabid family, he was briefly governor of the western provinces of Ifriqiyah (787 or 788) and Egypt (790-791), after which he was appointed to the eastern province of al-Sind (800), where he served for the remainder of his life.

Career
Dawud was the son of Yazid ibn Hatim, who served as the governor of Ifriqiyah for the caliphs al-Mansur, al-Mahdi, al-Hadi, and al-Rashid. Yazid died early in the reign of al-Rashid, at which point Dawud temporarily succeeded him as governor. His leadership, however, proved to be inadequate, and the government's authority within the province began to weaken. As a result, al-Rashid appointed Dawud's uncle Rawh ibn Hatim to take control of Ifriqiyah instead. Following this, Dawud was appointed over Egypt in 790. After serving as governor there for slightly more than a year, he was dismissed from that post as well and replaced with the Abbasid prince Musa ibn 'Isa.

In 800 Dawud was invested with the governorship of al-Sind and tasked with pacifying the province, which was plagued by a longstanding conflict between the Arab tribes there. He initially sent his brother al-Mughirah to take control of al-Mansurah, but the city's inhabitants rebelled and expelled him. Dawud then entered al-Sind in force and laid siege to al-Mansurah, which he managed to take several months later. He then proceeded to secure the other cities of al-Sind, thereby firmly reestablishing Abbasid control over the province.

Dawud spent the next two decades as governor of al-Sind, setting a record for the longest tenure of any governor in the early Abbasid period. Conditions in the province remained quiet for the remainder of his administration. He died in 820 or 821 and was succeeded by his son Bishr.

Notes

References
Al-Baladhuri, Ahmad ibn Jabir. The Origins of the Islamic State, Part II. Trans. Francis Clark Murgotten. New York: Columbia University, 1924.
Crone, Patricia. "Muhallabids." The Encyclopaedia of Islam, Volume VII. New Ed. Leiden: E. J. Brill, 1993.  
Kennedy, Hugh N. The Early Abbasid Caliphate, a political History. London: Croom Helm, 1981.  
Khalifah ibn Khayyat. Tarikh Khalifah ibn Khayyat. Ed. Akram Diya' al-'Umari. 3rd ed. Al-Riyadh: Dar Taybah, 1985. 
Al-Kindi, Muhammad ibn Yusuf. The Governors and Judges of Egypt. Ed. Rhuvon Guest. Leydon and London: E. J. Brill, 1912.
Al-Tabari, Abu Ja'far Muhammad ibn Jarir. The History of al-Tabari. Ed. Ehsan Yar-Shater. 40 vols. Albany, NY: State University of New York Press, 1985-2007.
Al-Ya'qubi, Ahmad ibn Abu Ya'qub. Historiae, Vol. 2. Ed. M. Th. Houtsma. Leiden: E. J. Brill, 1883.

8th-century births
8th-century Abbasid governors of Egypt
9th-century people from the Abbasid Caliphate
Abbasid governors of Egypt
Abbasid governors of Sind
Abbasid governors of Ifriqiya
Muhallabids
820s deaths
Year of birth unknown
8th-century Arabs
9th-century Arabs
8th-century people of Ifriqiya